Biodun Fatoyinbo (born 1 January 1976 in Kwara State, Nigeria) is a Nigerian pastor and author. He is the lead pastor of Commonwealth of Zion Assembly (COZA).

Life 
He was born into a family of four and attended the University of Ilorin where he started the church in 1999. Fatoyinbo is married to Modele Fatoyinbo

Sexual misconduct allegations
Fatoyinbo has been accused by multiple women of sexual assault.
First in August 2013 when Ese Walter alleged that Fatoyinbo had a sexual relationship with her while she worked in the church.

Sometime in June 2019, Busola Dakolo a celebrity photographer and wife to a gospel singer, Timi Dakolo also alleged that Fatoyinbo, on two different occasion, raped her as a minor about 20 years previously. However, Fatoyinbo denied the allegation. Busola Dakolo proceeded to file a rape complaint against Fatoyinbo, which the court dismissed, ruling that the case was empty and purely sentimental. The court fined Busola a sum of 1 Million Naira for wasting the court's time.

In January 2022 a former member of the COZA known as Nnenna Kalu-Ude accused Biodun Fatoyinbo complicity in the death of Tega Akpofure, a member of the COZA music team. Akpofure's husband subsequently contradicted the allegation.

References

Living people
Nigerian Christians
Yoruba Christian clergy
Nigerian Pentecostal pastors
Nigerian Christian writers
1976 births